Graeme Randall, MBE (born 14 March 1975) is a Scottish judoka. He competed at the 1996 Summer Olympics and the 2000 Summer Olympics, and won gold medals in the 81 kg division at both the 1999 World Judo Championships and 2002 Commonwealth Games.

Biography
Randall was educated at Lasswade High School, Midlothian, and the University of Edinburgh, where he completed a degree in Physical Education. In 1996, he was selected for Great Britain to compete at the Olympic Games in Atlanta, Georgia. Competing in the -78kg division, he lost his first round match and failed to progress any further. The following year in 1997, he finished fifth at the 1997 World Judo Championships.

In 1996, he won his first Scottish National Championship and in 1998 he became champion of Great Britain, winning the half-middleweight division at the British Judo Championships. The following year in 1999 he won a world title after winning the gold medal in the 81 kg division at the 1999 World Judo Championships.

The 1999 success made him a certain selection for the 2000 Olympic Games in Sydney. He fought in the -81kg division but was eliminated in his second match. In 2001, he won his second British Championship and third Scottish national title. At the 2002 Commonwealth Games in Manchester, representing Scotland he claimed the gold medal in the -81 kg division.

Randall was inducted into the Scottish Sports Hall of Fame in March 2010. He was the second male from Great Britain to hold a world title in judo. He was also seen in the STV series of Coached Off The Couch.

Achievements

References

External links
 

1975 births
Living people
Scottish male judoka
Judoka at the 1996 Summer Olympics
Judoka at the 2000 Summer Olympics
Olympic judoka of Great Britain
People educated at Lasswade High School Centre
Alumni of the University of Edinburgh
Members of the Order of the British Empire
Commonwealth Games gold medallists for Scotland
Commonwealth Games medallists in judo
Judoka at the 2002 Commonwealth Games
Medallists at the 2002 Commonwealth Games